Christopher Warren Jr. (born January 15, 1990) is an American actor. He is best known as Zeke Baylor in the High School Musical franchise, Ty in The Fosters and Jason Parker in Grand Hotel. Since 2020 he plays Hayden in BET TV series Sistas.

Career
Warren has been featured in such movies as 2000's Love & Basketball. From 2004 to 2005, he played Jimmy Ramírez on the soap opera The Bold and the Beautiful. Some of his television credits include guest appearances on Just Jordan and Zoey 101.  Chris first appeared as Zeke in High School Musical and reprised the role in High School Musical 2, and High School Musical 3: Senior Year.

He guest starred in Good Luck Charlie which starred his co-star Bridgit Mendler from Alvin and the Chipmunks: The Squeakquel. In 2017, Warren starred in the Jason Michael Brescia film (Romance) In the Digital Age. In 2019, he took on the role of Jason Parker in the ABC television series Grand Hotel. In 2020, he was cast as Hayden Moss, on Sistas, on BET.

Personal life
Chris Warren was born on January 15, 1990, in Indianapolis, Indiana to Christopher Warren Sr. and actress Brook Kerr. Chris married host Layla Kayleigh on May 23, 2019, and live in Los Angeles; they share a child together.

Filmography

Film

Television

References

External links

American male film actors
American male child actors
American male television actors
Living people
1990 births
Male actors from Indianapolis